Sandra Kenel (born 16 May 1973) is a Swiss fencer. She competed in the women's individual and team épée events at the 1996 Summer Olympics.

References

External links
 

1973 births
Living people
Swiss female épée fencers
Olympic fencers of Switzerland
Fencers at the 1996 Summer Olympics